Wammerawa, an electoral district of the Legislative Assembly in the Australian state of New South Wales, was created in 1920 and abolished in 1927.


Election results

Elections in the 1920s

1925

1922 re-count
The returning officer declared that William Ashford had been elected 3rd at the 1922 election. Joseph Clark lodged a petition that alleged the returning officer had made an error in the way he distributed surplus votes after the election of Harold Thorby. The Elections and Qualifications Committee agreed and after re-counting the votes declared that Clark had been elected.

1922

1920

References

New South Wales state electoral results by district